50 States of Fright  is a horror anthology series that debuted on Quibi on April 6, 2020, for pre-signed up users and on April 13 for the general public.

Premise
The series features self-contained scary stories, each located in a different state of the state in the United States. To fit Quibi's format, each story was spread across two or three episodes.

Cast 
 "The Golden Arm (Michigan)"
 Rachel Brosnahan as Heather
Travis Fimmel as David
 John Marshall Jones as Andy
 "America's Largest Ball of Twine (Kansas)"
 Ming-Na Wen as Susan
 Karen Allen as Sheriff Stallings
 Thailey Roberge as Amelia
 "Scared Stiff (Oregon)"
 James Ransone as Sebastian Klepner
 Emily Hampshire as Megan Bloom
 "Grey Cloud Island (Minnesota)"
 Asa Butterfield as Brandon Boyd
 "Almost There (Iowa)"
 Taissa Farmiga as Hannah
 Ron Livingston as Blake
 "13 Steps to Hell (Washington)"
 Lulu Wilson as Mallory
 Rory Culkin as Older Aiden / Storyteller
 "Red Rum (Colorado)"
 Jacob Batalon as Simon
 Victoria Justice as Logan
 Colin Ford as Kyle
 Christina Ricci as Bitsy
 "Dogwood-Azalea (Missouri)"
 Elizabeth Reaser as Sara

Episodes

Season 1 (2020)

Season 2 (2020)

References

External links 
 

Quibi original programming
2020s American drama television series
2020 American television series debuts
English-language television shows
Horror fiction web series